The ACMAT ALTV is a military pick-up car manufactured by the French company ACMAT (part of Arquus).

Description 
ALTV means Acmat Light Tactical Vehicle. It is a derivative of the Nissan Navara. It has a payload of 1.4 to 3.5 tonnes, depending on the version.

The ALTV is marketed under several variants, such as station wagon, single cab, double cab or torpedo.

Users 
More than 1000 have been produced and delivered to 20 countries in 2014.

 
 
 : 20
 : 14 for the National Police, transport version
 : 48, used by border guards
 
 : bought for the contractors of Sovereign Global that trained the Gabonese contingent of the MINUSCA.
 
 
 : armored command-post version
 
 : 44, used by the Togolese Police

References 

Military trucks of France
Military vehicles introduced in the 2000s